Thomas Supis (born January 21, 1992 in Villingen-Schwenningen) is a German professional ice hockey player. He is currently an unrestricted free agent who most recently played for the Krefeld Pinguine in the German Ice Hockey League.

He made his DEL debut with the Eisbären Berlin during the 2011–12 season. In his third full season with Krefeld Pinguine in 2016–17 season, he appeared in only 18 games, as the club finished in last position. Supis left the club on March 3, 2017, after it was revealed he would not be offered a new contract.

References

External links
 

1992 births
Living people
Eisbären Berlin players
German ice hockey defencemen
Krefeld Pinguine players
People from Villingen-Schwenningen
Sportspeople from Freiburg (region)